Mendoza may refer to:

Places

Argentina
 Greater Mendoza, the name given to the large urban conurbation around the city of Mendoza
 Mendoza, Argentina, the capital of the province of Mendoza
 Mendoza Department, subdivision of the Mendoza Province
 Mendoza Province
 Mendoza River, a river in the Mendoza Province
 Mendoza wine, a wine region located in the Mendoza province

Other places

 Mendoza, Panama, a corregimiento in La Chorrera District, Panamá Oeste Province, Panama
 Mendoza, Peru, capital of Rodríguez de Mendoza Province, Peru
 Rodríguez de Mendoza Province, a province of the Amazonas Region, Peru
 Mendoza, Álava, Basque Country, Spain
 Mendoza, Texas, a community in Caldwell County, Texas, U.S.
 Mendoza College of Business, at the University of Notre Dame, Indiana, U.S.
 Mendoza, Florida, a town in Florida, Uruguay
 Mendoza del Valle del Momboy, Valera Municipality, Trujillo State, Venezuela

People
 Mendoza (name), a Basque surname, and a list of people with the name
 House of Mendoza, a family of Spanish nobles who originated from Álava, Basque Country, Spain

Other uses
 3868 Mendoza, a main-belt asteroid
 Codex Mendoza, an Aztec codex, created fourteen years after the 1521 Spanish conquest of Mexico
 Fat Dog Mendoza, animated series
 Jackson Mendoza, short-lived Australian pop duo
 Monkey stick, called mendoza or mendozer, a traditional English percussion instrument
 Mendoza (The Mysterious Cities of Gold), a French-Japanese animated series that ran from 1982 to 1983
 Mendoza (spider),  a genus of jumping spiders
 Mendoza Line, a baseball term
 Productos Mendoza, a sports rifle and arms manufacturer in Mexico
 Universidad de Mendoza, Mendoza, Argentina

See also
 Mandoza (1978-2016), South African kwaito recording artist
 Mendonça, a Portuguese variation of the surname